Kohneh Hesar may refer to:
 Kohneh Hesar, Hamadan
 Kohneh Hesar, Markazi